Six Days of Justice is a British television drama anthology series of single plays created by Thames Television and shown on ITV from 1972 to 1975, over four seasons of six episodes apiece.

Synopsis

As suggested by the series title, each series of Six Days of Justice is made up of six separate plays, set in and around a  courtroom and the corridor and waiting area outside.  Focusing on magistrate and children's courts rather than the High Court, the series was praised for its naturalistic setting, lack of melodrama and low-key approach to small-time crime.

Episodes

Series 1

Series 2

Series 3

Series 4

DVD release

Series 1 and series 2 were released by Network DVD in 2012.

References

1970s British anthology television series
1972 British television series debuts
1975 British television series endings
1970s British drama television series
ITV television dramas
Television series by Fremantle (company)
Television shows produced by Thames Television
English-language television shows